Andriy Vitaliyovych Shtohrin (born 14 December 1998) is a Ukrainian professional footballer who plays for Chornomorets Odesa.

Club career

Chornomorets Odesa
He made his Ukrainian Premier League debut for FC Chornomorets Odesa on 19 May 2018 in a game against FC Zirka Kropyvnytskyi.

References

External links
 
 

1998 births
Footballers from Odesa
Living people
Ukrainian footballers
Association football forwards
FC Chornomorets Odesa players
FC Chornomorets-2 Odesa players
Ukrainian Premier League players
Ukrainian First League players
Ukrainian Second League players